Maria Louise Joensen (born 21 January 1985), known as Aura Dione, is a Danish singer and songwriter. In 2008 she released her debut album, Columbine. The album spawned the hit single "I Will Love You Monday (365)", which reached number one in Germany, achieved over 80 million video views and was certified platinum.

After winning the European Border Breaker Award in 2011, Dione won Best Female Artist and Hit of the Year for "Geronimo" at the Danish Music Awards 2012 and Female Artist of the Year in 2013; she is one of Denmark's top two female recording artists and one of Germany's top three.

Life and career

Early life 
Aura Dione was born Maria Joensen on 21 January 1985 in Copenhagen, Denmark. Her mother is Faroese of French descent, while her father is of Danish and Spanish descent. Her parents introduced her to music, and she began writing songs when she was as young as 8 years old. Her parents were hippies who with Aura as a child sailed all the world's oceans, until the 7-year-old was given residence on Bornholm . Here, she began her formal schooling and as a teenager enrolled to Secondary school, but in the middle of her education she chose to move to Australia where she sought inspiration from the Aborigines. This later resulted into a song "Something From Nothing".

2007–2010: Columbine and international breakthrough 

Dione debuted in summer 2007 with the single "Something From Nothing", but has also gained success with the track "Song for Sophie" - both from her album Columbine, which was released in 2008. The single "I Will Love You Monday" a No.1 hit in Europe, where it was issued in an expanded version titled "I Will Love You Monday (365)".

2011–2015: Before the Dinosaurs 
Dione released her second international studio album Before the Dinosaurs on 4 November 2011. The first single release "Geronimo" was produced by David Jost and went straight to the #1 in the official German Media Control Charts. In the very same year Aura Dione won a European Border Breakers Award for her international breakthrough. Aura Dione recently released the second single "Friends" of her international hit album Before the Dinosaurs. The song is written and produced by Dione, David Jost and Rock Mafia and reached the official German Radio Charts #1. "Friends" is Dione's third Radio #1 single.

Personal life 
Dione was engaged to Danish billionaire Janus Friis but the couple split up in April 2015.

Awards and recognition 
Danish Music Awards

|-
| rowspan="2"|2009
| Columbine
| Årets Danske Pop Udgivelse
| 
|-
| rowspan="4"|Herself
| rowspan="2"|Årets Danske Kvindelige Kunstner
| 
|-
| rowspan="5"|2012
| 
|-
| Årets Publikumpris 
| 
|-
| Ærespris
| 
|-
| Before the Dinosaurs
| Årets Danske Pop Udgivelse
| 
|-
| "Geronimo"
| Årets Danske Hit
| 

GAFFA Awards

!Ref.
|-
| rowspan=2|2021
| Herself
| Best Danish Solo Act
| 
|rowspan=2|
|-
| Fearless Lovers
| Best Danish Pop Album 
|

MTV Europe Music Awards

|-
| 2012
| Herself
| Best Danish Act
|

Discography

Albums

Extended plays

Singles

Featured singles

Promotional singles

Notes

References

External links

Official website

1985 births
Living people
Danish  women singer-songwriters
Musicians from Copenhagen
Danish people of Spanish descent
Danish people of French descent
Danish people of Faroese descent
English-language singers from Denmark
Island Records artists
21st-century Danish women singers